Ryan P. Heritage is a United States Marine Corps major general who serves as the Commander of the Marine Corps Forces Cyberspace Command and Marine Corps Forces Space Command since July 7, 2021	. Previously, he served as the commander of the Marine Corps Recruit Depot San Diego. Heritage earned a bachelor's degree in international relations from George Washington University in 1990. He later received a master's degree in military studies from the Marine Corps Command and Staff College at Marine Corps University and a second master's degree in national security and strategic studies from the Army War College.

References

External links

Year of birth missing (living people)
Living people
Place of birth missing (living people)
Elliott School of International Affairs alumni
Marine Corps University alumni
United States Army War College alumni
Recipients of the Legion of Merit
United States Marine Corps generals
Recipients of the Defense Superior Service Medal